

Scaphytopiini is an insect tribe of leafhoppers in the subfamily Deltocephalinae. The scope of the tribe was restricted by Zahniser & Dietrich (2013) to include only 3 genera.

Genera
 Ascius DeLong, 1943
 Scaphytopius Ball, 1931
 Tenuarus DeLong, 1944

Genera transferred out by Zahniser & Dietrich

Genera now placed in Athysanini
 Nesothamnus Linnavuori, 1959
 Scaphytoceps Dlabola, 1957

Genera now placed in Cicadulini
 Proceps Mulsant & Rey, 1855

Genera now placed in Opsiini
 Afrascius Linnavuori, 1969
 Japananus Ball, 1931

Genera now placed in Scaphoideini
 Coroticus Distant, 1918
 Grammacephalus Haupt, 1929
 Sikhamani Viraktamath & Webb, 2006
 Sudhamruta Viraktamath & Anantha Murthy, 1999
 Thryaksha Viraktamath & Anantha Murthy, 1999
 Univagris Viraktamath & Anantha Murthy, 1999

Genera now placed in Vartini
 Curvimonus Viraktamath & Anantha Murthy, 1999
 Shivania Viraktamath, 2004
 Stymphalus Stål, 1866
 Varta Distant, 1908
 Vartalapa Viraktamath, 2004
 Vartatopa Viraktamath, 2004
 Xenovarta Viraktamath, 2004

References

External links

 
Deltocephalinae
Hemiptera tribes